Elchin Ilyas oglu Afandiyev is an Azerbaijani writer, professor and politician who served as Deputy Prime Minister of Azerbaijan from 1993 to 2018.

Early years
Afandiyev was born to the family of famous Azerbaijani writer Ilyas Afandiyev on May 13, 1943 in Baku. Since his early childhood, Elchin Afandiyev was surrounded by literature and an academic environment. Azerbaijani folklore and world literature played a significant role in Afandiyev's future career. He wrote his first novel when he was 16 years old, which was published in Azərbaycan gəncləri (Azerbaijani Youth) magazine in 1959. He completed his secondary education in 1960 and studied at Baku State University, graduating in 1965 with a degree in philology. In 1968, he completed his post-graduate studies at the Nizami Institute of the Azerbaijan National Academy of Sciences, writing a 500-page dissertation. In 1965, he published a collection of novels called Min gecədən biri (One of thousand nights). In the following years, nearly 100 books of Afandiyev were translated and published in English, French, German, Spanish, Turkish, Hungarian, Bulgarian, Arabic, Persian, Mandarin, Czech, Slovak, Polish, Croatian, Georgian, Lithuanian, Moldovan, Turkmen, Uzbek, Kazakh, Tajik, Serbian and other languages. There have been about five million copies sold worldwide.

Political career
During Soviet rule, Afandiyev was a deputy in the Supreme Soviet of the Azerbaijan SSR. Since 1993, he has served as Deputy Prime Minister of Azerbaijan. As a Deputy Prime Minister, he supervises various sectors of government activity such as sports and cultural relations. He has also chaired the Vətən cultural organization, which focuses on cultural ties with other countries. He is also a member of several government committees and is a member of Education Committee under the President of Azerbaijan.

Awards
Efendiyev was awarded with Istiglal Order for his contributions to the development of Azerbaijani literature by President of Azerbaijan Heydar Aliyev on May 29, 2003.

See also

Cabinet of Azerbaijan
Politics of Azerbaijan
Literature of Azerbaijan

References

Writers from Baku
Azerbaijani professors
1943 births
Living people
Azerbaijan Communist Party (1920) politicians
Azerbaijani politicians
Azerbaijani writers
Azerbaijani screenwriters
Political office-holders in Azerbaijan
Baku State University alumni
Recipients of the Istiglal Order